Marcelino Sambé (born 29 April 1994) is a Portuguese ballet dancer. He is a principal dancer with The Royal Ballet in London.

Early life
Sambé was born on International Dance Day 1994 to a Guinean father and Portuguese mother in an immigrant community at the outskirt of Lisbon. His father worked in construction. Sambé attended African dance classes at a local community centre despite being the only boy in the troupe. When he was 8, the community centre's psychologist encouraged Sambé to audition for National Conservatory of Lisbon to train ballet, even though he did not know what ballet was. He ended up improvising an African dance routine for the panel, and was accepted to the Conservatory. Soon, he started training in the Vaganova method. Sambé's father died shortly afterwards, as Sambé's mother could not take care of both Sambé and his sister, so he was fostered by a family whose daughter was also training at the Conservatory, and later became a dancer at the National Ballet of Portugal.

After winning a scholarship at the Prix de Lausanne, he moved The Royal Ballet School in London at age 16.

Career
Sambé joined The Royal Ballet in 2012, a year ahead of his scheduled graduation. He was made First Artist in 2014, Soloist in 2015 and First Soloist in 2017.

In 2019, he was promoted to Principal Dancer, making him the second black male dancer, after Carlos Acosta, to reach this rank in the company. His promotion came after his debuts as Basilio in Don Quixote, for which he was coached by Acosta, and Romeo in Romeo and Juliet. Sambé' has also originated roles in works by choreographers such as Crystal Pite, Hofesh Shechter and Cathy Marston. His frequent partners on stage include Francesca Hayward, Yasmine Naghdi and Anna Rose O'Sullivan. As a choreographer himself, Sambé has choreographed for The Royal Ballet School's annual matinee and The Royal Ballet’s Draft Works.

In 2020, he was featured in the BBC documentary, Men at the Barre. That year, his debut as Prince Siegfried in Swan Lake was delayed due to the coronavirus pandemic.

Selected repertoire
Sambé's repertoire with The Royal Ballet includes:

Awards
Awards:
2008: Moscow International Ballet Competition - silver prize
2009: Youth America Grand Prix - first prize
2010: USA International Ballet Competition - gold medal and special award
2011: Ursula Morton Choreographic Awards - second prize
2012: Youth Dance England - UK’s emerging choreographers
2017: Critics' Circle National Dance Awards - Outstanding Male Classical Performance
2019: Outstanding Male Classical Performance - Best Male Dancer

Personal life
Sambé is openly gay. He and his partner live in North London.

Sambé took up photography when he was recovering from an injury, and has an Instagram account dedicated to his photographs of other Royal Ballet dancers.

References

External links
Royal Ballet biography
Sambé in Flight Pattern

1994 births
Portuguese male ballet dancers
People educated at the Royal Ballet School
Living people
People from Lisbon
Principal dancers of The Royal Ballet
Portuguese people of Guinean descent
Portuguese expatriates in England
21st-century ballet dancers
LGBT dancers
Portuguese LGBT entertainers